The City of Preston is a city and non-metropolitan district in Lancashire, England. On the north bank of the River Ribble, it was granted city status in 2002, becoming England's 50th city in the 50th year of Queen Elizabeth II's reign.

The district, formerly known as the Borough of Preston, is named after the urban settlement of Preston which lies in the south of the district, and also contains nine civil parishes.

History
In 1974, the non-metropolitan district of Preston was formed from the County Borough of Preston, Fulwood Urban District, and a major part of Preston Rural District. The district was granted city status in 2002.

Governance

Preston City Council

The City of Preston is divided into 16 district council wards represented by 48 councillors. In 2017 there are about 6,000 electors per ward, expected to rise to about 6,300 electors per ward by 2023. Preston City councillors serve a four-year term. Preston City Council is elected "by thirds", 16 at a time. One councillor from each ward is elected every year for three years. Every fourth year there are no Preston City Council elections, Lancashire County Council elections taking place instead. Like much of the United Kingdom, Preston has a ceremonial mayor, who holds the role of the first citizen of the city. The role dates back to 1327, and the current mayor is Councillor Javed Iqbal, who is the 963rd Mayor of Preston.

Preston operates a Leader and Cabinet system. The current Leader is Councillor Matthew Brown.

There are 48 elected councillors, who meet every two months at the full council meetings. However, most of the decisions are made by a cabinet composed of the Leader of the Council and nine Cabinet Members:
 Deputy Leader and Cabinet Member for Resources, 
 Cabinet Member for Community Wealth Building
 Cabinet Member for Planning and Regulation
 Cabinet Member for Environment and Community Safety
 Cabinet Member for Service Transformation
 Cabinet Member for Climate Change
 Cabinet Member for Culture and Arts
 Cabinet Member for Communities and Social Justice
 Cabinet Member for Health and Wellbeing

These decisions scrutinised by the Overview and Scrutiny Committee, which has a cross-party composition.

The city is divided into districts, which are in turn divided into wards.

Following a boundary review, the May 2019 election was held on 16 new wards, with three councillors in each ward. The election resulted in 30 Labour Party councillors, 9 Conservative Party councillors and 9 Liberal Democrats councillors. The May 2020 elections were deferred until May 2021 due to the COVID-19 pandemic. After the 2021 Preston City Council election, the Council consisted of 30 Labour Party councillors, 11 Conservative Party councillors and 7 Liberal Democrats councillors.

The local areas of Preston can be found at Districts of Preston.

Freedom of the City

Freedom of the City has been granted to:

The Loyal Regiment (North Lancashire) – 7 August 1952; this was subsequently transferred to The Queen's Lancashire Regiment on 9 September 1972
Sir Tom Finney, Preston football player – 6 September 1979
The Duke of Lancaster's Regiment – 1 July 2006
Ian Hall J.P., – Councillor, May 1992
Nick Park, – film maker, October 1997
Andrew Flintoff, England cricket captain, – January 2006
Ken Hudson JP MBE, Mayor 1993–1994, Leader of the City 2007–2011, admitted in recognition of his 36 years' service to the council and the citizens of Preston, August 2014.

Lancashire County Council

The City of Preston contains nine Lancashire County Council electoral divisions, with one county councillor in each district.

Parliament
The City of Preston is currently divided between three Westminster constituencies, namely Preston, Wyre and Preston North, and Fylde. The three seats are all safe seats, with all Members of Parliament holding over 50% of the vote for their respective parties.

Historically, Preston has been divided between such constituencies as Preston North, Preston South, and Fylde South, although until 1885 it comprised one constituency called Preston, which actually included most of West Lancashire.

Minster Church
Like numerous other major English towns granted city status since 1889, Preston has no Anglican cathedral (see City status in the United Kingdom). Instead, following the granting of city status in the Queen's Golden Jubilee year in 2002, Preston's parish church was elevated by the Church of England to the status of Minster Church in June 2003.

Geography

Physical geography

The City of Preston district is a transitional region between coastal plain, river valley and moorland. The west of the district lies within the flat coastal plain of the Fylde. The southern border is the River Ribble which meanders through a flood plain in a wide, steep-sided valley. The northeast of the district lies within the Forest of Bowland Area of Outstanding Beauty.

The lowest point lies on the River Ribble in the southwest corner of the district. The Ribble here is tidal and therefore virtually at sea level. The course of the river west of Preston was artificially straightened in the 19th century, to ease passage of shipping to the docks.

The southern one-third of the district, most of which is covered by Preston and its suburbs, drains into Savick Brook running east-to-west and then turning south into the Ribble. The lowest section of the brook has been widened into the Ribble Link which connects the Lancaster Canal to the Ribble. The central and northern parts of the district drain into south- and west-flowing tributaries of the River Brock, itself a tributary of the Wyre whose estuary is at Fleetwood. The Brock forms part of the district boundary on the west and north sides of Beacon Fell. A small part of the district along the eastern boundary drains into the east-flowing River Loud, a tributary of the Hodder.

The lowland area in the north and east of the district, between Beacon Fell and the Fylde, is a dairy farming area, particularly noted for its cheesemaking dairies. Six of the ten Lancashire Cheese dairies listed on the British Cheese Board's website in 2011 are located in the City of Preston district (and the other four are only a few miles outside). Beacon Fell Traditional Lancashire Cheese is a Protected Designation of Origin cheese named after Beacon Fell.

At , Preston city centre is approximately 27 miles north west of Manchester, 26 miles north east of Liverpool, and 15 miles east of the coastal town Blackpool.

Like most of inland Lancashire, Preston receives a higher than UK average total of rainfall, and is slightly colder. On 10 August 1893 Preston entered the UK Weather Records, with the Highest 5-min total rainfall of 32 mm. As of November 2008 this remains a record.

Areas and estates

As with many cities, Preston has developed from a number of former towns and villages.

Civic geography

The southern part of the district is mostly urbanised but the northern part is quite rural.  The current borders came into effect on 1 April 1974, when the Local Government Act 1972 merged the existing County Borough of Preston with Fulwood Urban District and part of Preston Rural District.  Preston was designated as part of the Central Lancashire new town in 1970.  The former Preston Rural District part of the district is divided into a number of civil parishes:

Barton
Broughton
Goosnargh
Grimsargh
Haighton
Ingol and Tanterton (neighbourhood, created April 2012)
Lea
Whittingham
Woodplumpton

Demography

Ethnicity
Preston is a diverse city, although the majority of the ethnic minorities are South Asians, in particular Indians. The ethnic makeup of Preston based on the 2011 census is as follows (With average for England in brackets): 75.8% White British (79.8%), 0.8% White Irish (1.0%), 3.5% Other White (4.6%). 2.3% Mixed Race (2.2%). 10.3% Indian (2.6%), 3.2% Pakistani (2.1%), 0.3% Bangladeshi (0.8%), 0.9% Other Asian (1.5%). 0.6% Black Caribbean (1.1%), 0.5% Black African (1.8%), 0.1% Other Black (0.5%). 0.9% Chinese (0.7%), 0.4% Arab (0.4%) and 0.3% other (0.6%).

Child poverty
In 2008 a survey revealed that 50% of all children living in the city were living in families suffering from financial depression. An estimated 15,380 youngsters were part of the families on the breadline. The Campaign to End Child Poverty report defined children in poverty as children living in homes where occupants work less than 16 hours a week, or not at all, or where the full amount of tax credit is being claimed. The city was one of the most severely affected areas of the North West outside Liverpool and Manchester, with 21% of children in the city living in households which were completely workless and a further 29% in families struggling to get by with working tax credits. The two worst affected areas of the city were the Deepdale and St George's wards, where 75% and 77% of children respectively were said to be living in poverty.

Religion

The City of Preston lies in the Roman Catholic Diocese of Lancaster and the Anglican Diocese of Blackburn.

In July 2016, St Ignatius Church in Preston, which had been gifted by the Catholic Diocese of Lancaster to the Syro-Malabar Catholic community, was raised to the status of a cathedral by Pope Francis. It now serves as the seat of the Syro-Malabar Catholic Eparchy of Great Britain

The 2001 Census recorded 72% of the population as Christians, 10% as having no religion, and 8% as Muslim. The Hindu and Sikh populations are smaller at 3% and 0.6% respectively, but in both cases this represents the highest percentage of any local authority area in the North West. 2% of the city's population were born in other EU countries.

References

External links

Preston City Council website

 
Local government in Preston
Cities in North West England
Non-metropolitan districts of Lancashire
Boroughs in England